The Archdeacon of Cork was a senior ecclesiastical officer within the Anglican Diocese of Cork, Cloyne and Ross. The Archdeacon was responsible for the disciplinary supervision of the clergy  within the Diocese.

The archdeaconry can trace its history back to Patrick M'Carthy who held the office in 1157.

Many of them went on to higher office:
 Henry de Thrapston
 William Steere
 Michael Boyle
 John Whetham
 Mervyn Archdall
 William Edward Flewett
 Robert Thomas Hearn 
 Hedley Webster
 Michael Hugh Gunton Mayes

The office has now been replaced by the post of Archdeacon of Cork, Cloyne and Ross

References

 
Lists of Anglican archdeacons in Ireland
Diocese of Cork, Cloyne and Ross